Orebygaard is a manor house and estate located on Lolland in southeastern Denmark. The current main building, a Neo-Renaissance style building with two towers, is from 1872–1874. It was listed on the Danish registry of protected buildings and places in 1985.

History
In the 13th century Orebygaard belonged to the crown and played an important role in the defence of the coast. The first private owner was Sivert Lauridsen, a nobleman, who owned the estate from 1315 to 1316. A later owner was Erik Sjællandsfar, possibly an illegitimate son of Erik Menved, whose daughter Bodil Eriksdatter brought it into her marriage with Laurids Jensen Blaa. Their sons, Sivert and Oluf Lauridsen Blaa, divided the estate in two. This lasted until the beginning of the 16th century when Mads Eriksen Bølle obtained full ownership of the estate. Bølle supported the Catholic party during the Count's Feud and his estate was on several occasions looted by citizens from Sakskøbing. His grand daughter, Birgitte Bølle, brought Orebygaard into her marriage with Christoffer Gøye, a son of Mogens Gøye. They were major landowners but had no children. Orebygaard was therefore passed on to one of Birgitte Bølle's more distant relatives, Axel Ottesen Brahe. whose son sold it to Jakob Ulfeldt in 1618. It was then owned by members of the Ulfeldt family until Sophie Ulfeldt brought it into the Holck family through her marriage to Christian Christopher Holck.

 
In 1775, Orebygaard was sold in auction to Poul Abraham Lehn, He was already the owner of Berritzgaard and Højbygård on Lolland and Hvidkilde, Nielstrup and Lindskov on Funen. He acquired Lungholm on Lolland in 1784.

 
Orebygaard and Berritsgaard were in 1784 merged into a barony under the name Guldborgland. In 1803, Højbygaard and Lungholm were converted into a stamhus under the name Sønderkarle.

When Poul Abraham Lehn died in 1804, Guldborgland was passed on to his grand daughter Christiane Henriette von Barner. She married
Otto Ditlev baron Kaas-Lehn on 1 September that same year but he died in 1811. In 1820, she was married for a second time to Henrik Christian Rosenørn. Henrik Christian Rosenørn was shortly thereafter created friherre under the name Rosenørn-Lehn. Christiane Henriette von Barner took over the management of the estates after her husband's death in 1847. The baronies of Guldborgland waspassed on to her eldest son Otto Ditlev Rosenørn-Lehn When she died in 1860. It was as a result of the lensafløsningsloven of 1919 dissolved with effect from 1922.

Architecture
 
Hans van Steenwinckel the Elder constructed a new main building for Birgitte Bølle 1578–1587. It was a one-winged, two-storey brick  building with a tower in each end. In 1638, it was expanded with a chapel to the southwest. Christiane Henriette von Barners modernized the main building in 1813–1815 with assistance of  J. Chr. West. The two towers were removed and the exterior adapted to the Neoclassical style. The building received its current appearance when it was adapted by the architect Petersen in 1872–1874.

The current Neo-Renaissance style main building is constructed in red brick with horizontal cement bands. It consists of a long north-south oriented main wing with two short side wings to the east and an octagonal tower at its southwestern corner and a larger, square corner at the northwestern corner. in the 1890s the interior underwent minor alterations in the under supervision of the architect Axel Berg.

List of owners
 ( -1315) Kronen 
 (1315–1316) Sivert Lauridsen 
 (1333–1336) Sivert Sivertsen 
 ( -1370) Erik Sjællandsfar 
 (1370- ) Margrethe Glob, gift Sjællandsfar 
 ( – ) Bodil Eriksdatter, gift Blaa 
 (1394–1408) Laurids Jensen Blaa 
 (1408- ) Sivert Lauridsen Blaa 
 (1408–1456) Oluf Lauridsen Blaa 
 ( -1535) Anne Sivertsdatter Blaa, gift Bølle 
 ( -1539) Mads Eriksen Bølle 
 ( -1535) Eiler Eriksen Bølle 
 (1456–1516) Niels Andersen Basse 
 (1456–1474) Peder Olufsen Blaa 
 (1456- ) Jørgen Olufsen Blaa 
 (1456- ) Jacob Olufsen Blaa 
 (1456–1503) Erik Olufsen Blaa 
 (1503–1524) Inger Hansdatter Pøiske, gift Blaa 
 ( – ) Barbara Eriksdatter Blaa, gift Huitfeldt 
 (1504- ) Otte Clausen Huitfeldt 
 (1516- ) Christiern Nielsen Dyre 
 ( -1539) Mads Eriksen Bølle
 (1539–1562) Erik Madsen Bølle 
 (1562) Birgitte Bølle, gift Gøye 
 (1562–1584) Christoffer Gøye 
 (1584–1595) Birgitte Bølle, gift Gøye 
 (1595–1616) Axel Ottesen Brahe 
 (1616–1618) Falk Axelsen Brahe 
 (1618–1630) Jakob Ulfeldt 
 (1630–1636) Frantz Ulfeldt 
 (1636–1657) Flemming Ulfeldt 
 (1657–1690) Anne Elisabeth von der Groeben, gift Ulfeldt 
 (1657) Sophie Ulfeldt gift Holck 
 (1657–1676) Christian Christopher Holck 
 (1676–1698) Sophie Ulfeldt, gift Holck 
 (1698–1724) Hilleborg Holck 
 (1724–1774) Christian Christoffer Holck 
 (1774–1775) Gustav Frederik Holck-Winterfeldt og Henrik de Flindt 
 (1775–1804) Poul Abraham Lehn 
 (1804) Christiane Henriette von Barner gift 1) Kaas, 2) Rosenørn 
 (1804–1811) Otto Ditlev Kaas-Lehn 
 (1811–1820) Christiane Henriette von Barner gift 1) Kaas, 2) Rosenørn 
 (1820–1847) Henrik Christian Rosenørn-Lehn 
 (1847–1860) Christiane Henriette von Barner gift 1) Kaas, 2) Rosenørn 
 (1860–1892) Otto Ditlev Rosenørn-Lehn 
 (1892–1899) Christian Conrad Sophus Rosenørn-Lehn 
 (1899–1935) Frederik Marcus Rosenørn-Lehn 
 (1935–1970) Christian Carl Otto Rosenørn-Lehn 
 (1970–2001) Michael Rosenørn-Lehn 
 (2001– ) Hans Michael Jebsen

Today
The main building and park was in 2001 acquired by the Hong Kong-based Danish businessman Hans Michael Jebsen.

References

External links

Listed buildings and structures in Guldborgsund Municipality
Manor houses in Guldborgsund Municipality
Listed castles and manor houses in Denmark
Renaissance Revival architecture in Denmark
Houses completed in 1874
Buildings and structures associated with the Bølle family
Buildings and structures associated with the Ulfeldt family